Allophylus dodsonii is a species of plant in the family Sapindaceae. It is endemic to Ecuador.

References

Flora of Ecuador
dodsonii
Endangered plants
Taxonomy articles created by Polbot